RFF may refer to:

Organizations
 Rainforest Foundation Fund, charitable foundation dedicated to preserving the rainforest through preserving indigenous peoples rights
 Reading for the Future, a series of grassroots groups that encourage literacy using speculative fiction (science fiction, fantasy, etc.)
 Réseau Ferré de France,  company that owned and maintained the French national railway network from 1997 to 2014 
 Resources for the Future, an American nonprofit that researches the environment, energy and natural resources
 Ricardo Franco Front, a Colombian revolutionary guerrilla group

Other
 Regina Folk Festival, annual music festival in Saskatchewan, Canada
 Request for feedback, a page concerning Wikipedia article feedback
 Rescue Firefighting can refer to Aircraft Rescue and Firefighting